Transport in the Keihanshin metropolitan region is much like that of Tokyo: it includes public and private rail and highway networks; airports for international, domestic, and general aviation; buses; motorcycle delivery services, walking, bicycling, and commercial shipping.  The nexus is in the central part of Osaka, though Kobe and Kyoto are major centers in their own right. Every part of Keihanshin has rail or road transport services.  The sea and air transport is available from a limited number of ports for the general public.

Public transport within Keihanshin is dominated by an extensive public system, beginning with an urban rail network second only to that of Greater Tokyo, consisting of over seventy railway lines of surface trains and subways run by numerous operators; buses, monorails, and trams support the primary rail network. Over 13 million people use the public transit system daily as their primary means of travel. Like Tokyo, walking and bicycling are much more common than in many cities around the globe. Trips by bicycle (including joint trips with railway) in Osaka is at 33.9% with railway trips alone having the highest share at 36.4%, the combined railway share (rail alone, rail and bus, rail and bicycle) is at 45.7%. Walking alone has a modal share of 8.5%. Private automobiles and motorcycles play a secondary role in urban transport with private automobiles only having a 9.9% modal share in Osaka.

Airports

Primary

Osaka Airport (Itami Airport) served 16 million domestic passengers in 2019, and Kansai International Airport served 29 million international and domestic passengers. Kobe Airport is the region's newest airport, and has mostly domestic services, with a few international charter flights, serving 3 million passengers.

Secondary
Yao Airport serves the area's general aviation needs.  Still further across Osaka Bay into Shikoku lies Tokushima Airport, also capable of handling large planes, and a possible alternative airport for the region (for evacuation, disaster relief, emergency landings, cargo, overload etc.).

There are also a number of JASDF military facilities.

Rail 
The rail network in Keihanshin is very dense, with the average number of daily passengers topping 13 million. Railway usage and density is similar to that of Greater Tokyo, despite the smaller population base of Keihanshin. As in Tokyo, few free maps exist of the entire network; instead, most show only the stations of a particular company, and whole network maps (see, for example, this map of Keihanshin's rail network) often are confusing simply because they are so large.

In addition to above-ground and below-ground rail lines, the Sanyō and Tōkaidō Shinkansen serve as the backbone of intercity rail transport.

History
Japan's first streetcar opened in 1895 in Kyoto.

List of operating passenger rail lines

 West Japan Railway Company (JR West)
 High-speed rail
 San'yō Shinkansen
 Intercity of JR West
 Tōkaidō Main Line
 ●Biwako Line
 ●JR Kyoto Line
 ●JR Kobe Line
 San'yō Main Line
 ●JR Kobe Line
 Fukuchiyama Line
 ●JR Takarazuka Line
Hokuriku Main Line
 ●Biwako Line shared with Tokaido Main Line
 Kansai Main Line
 ●Yamatoji Line
 Kakogawa Line
Kisei Main Line
 Kinokuni Line
 Sanin Main Line
 ●Sagano Line
 Urban Network of JR West
Akō Line
Biwako Line
●Hanwa Line
Kansai Airport Line
●Katamachi Line (Gakkentoshi Line)
JR Kobe Line
●Kosei Line
JR Kyoto Line
Nara Line
●Osaka Loop Line
 ●Osaka Higashi Line
Sagano Line
Sakurai Line (Man-yo Mahoroba Line)
Sakurajima Line (JR Yumesaki Line)
JR Takarazuka Line
●JR Tōzai Line
Yamatoji Line
Wakayama Line
 JR Central
 High-speed rail
 Tōkaidō Shinkansen
 Hanshin Electric Railway
 Main Line Hanshin Namba Line
 Mukogawa Line
 Hankai Tramway Hankai Line
 Uemachi Line
 Hankyu Railway ●Kobe Line
 Itami Line
 Imazu Line
 Kōyō Line
 Kōbe Kōsoku Line
 ●Takarazuka Line
 Minoo Line
 ●Kyoto Line
 Senri Line
 Arashiyama Line
 Keihan Electric Railway  Keihan Main Line
 Ōtō Line
 Nakanoshima Line
 Katano Line
 Uji Line
 Keishin Line
 Ishiyama Sakamoto Line

 Kintetsu  Nara Line
 Namba Line
 Ikoma Line
  Kyoto Line
 Kashihara Line
Tenri Line
Tawaramoto Line
 Keihanna Line
 Osaka Line
Shigi Line
 Minami Osaka Line
 Yoshino Line
Domyoji Line
Nagano Line
Gose Line
 Kintetsu owned, but different operator
Iga Line
 Nankai Electric Railway'''
 Nankai Main Line
Takashinohama Line
Airport Line
Tanagawa Line
Kada Line
Wakayamako Line
 Koya Line
Shiomibashi Line
 Kita-Osaka Kyuko Railway
 Osaka Metro 
 ●Midōsuji Line
 ●Tanimachi Line
 ●Yotsubashi Line
 ●Chūō Line
 ●Sennichimae Line
 ●Sakaisuji Line
 ●Nagahori Tsurumi-ryokuchi Line
 ●Imazatosuji Line
 ●Nankō Port Town Line
 Kyoto Municipal Subway
 ●Karasuma Line
 ●Tōzai Line
 Kobe Municipal Subway
 ●Seishin-Yamate Line
 ●Kaigan Line
 Osaka Monorail
 Kobe Electric Railway
 Arima Line
 Ao Line
 Sanda Line
 Shintetsu Kōen-Toshi Line
 Sanyo Electric Railway
Main Line
Aboshi Line
 Kobe Rapid Railway
Tozai Line
Namboku Line
Hokushin Line
 Keifuku Electric Railroad
Arashiyama Main Line
 Kitano Line
 Eizan Electric Railway
 Eizan Main Line
 Kurama Line
 Nose Electric Railway
 Myōken Line
 Nissei Line
 Kobe New Transit
Port Island Line (Port Liner)
Rokkō Island Line (Rokko Liner)

List of cable car/funicular lines
 Keihan Electric Railway Cable Line (鋼索線), also called Otokoyama Cable (男山ケーブル)
 Kintetsu
 Ikoma Cable Line (Toriimae - Ikoma-Sanjo)
 Nishi-Shigi Cable Line
 Katsuragisan Ropeway
 Nankai Railway Cable Line (鋼索線)
 Sanyo Electric Railway Sumaura Ropeway
 Keifuku Electric Railroad
Eizan Cable (叡山鋼索線)
Eizan Ropeway (叡山ロープウェイ)
 Nose Electric Railway Myōken Cable

List of incomplete/abandoned lines

Japanese National Railways/JR West
Osaka Minato Line
Osaka Tōkō Line
Hanshin Electric Railway
Kita-Osaka Line
Kokudo Line
Koshien Line
Amagasaki Kaigan Line
Mukogawa Line
Imazu Deyashiki Line
Amagasaki Takarazuka Line
Daini Hanshin Line
Hankai Tramway
Hirano Line
Ohama Branch Line
 Hankyu Electric Railway
 Kitano Line
 Kamitsutsui Line

 Kintetsu
Hase Line (長谷線)
Sanjo Line (山上線)
Horyuji Line (法隆寺線)
Obusa Line (小房線)
Higashi-Shigi Cable Line
Hokusei Line (北勢線)
 Nankai Railway
Tennoji Branch Line (天王寺支線)
Kitajima Branch Line (北島支線)
Wakayamako Line (和歌山港線)
Osaka Tram Line (大阪軌道線)
Hirano Line (平野線)
Ohama Branch Line (大浜支線)
Wakayama Tram Line (和歌山軌道線)

Rail Ridership
Following table lists annual ridership in millions of passengers a year, average daily in parenthesis.

Note above table does not yet include figures for Kobe Municipal Subway, Kitakyu, Kobe New Transit, Kobe Rapid, Noseden, or Shintetsu.

Buses 

There are numerous private and public bus companies with hundreds of routes throughout the region.  Most bus routes complement existing rail service to form an effective intermodal transit network.

Taxis 
Taxis also serve a similar role to buses, supplementing the rail system, especially after midnight when most rail lines cease to operate. Persons moving around the city on business often chose taxis for convenience, as do people setting out in small groups.

Roads 

National, prefectural, and local roads crisscross the region.

Local and regional highways 
National Route 1
National Route 2
National Route 8
National Route 9
National Route 24 (Kyoto - Nara Prefecture - Wakayama Prefecture)
National Route 25 (Osaka - Nara - Nagoya)
National Route 26 (Osaka - Wakayama)
National Route 28 (Kobe - Awaji - Tokushima, Tokushima)
National Route 171 (Kobe - Kyoto, San'yōdō)
National Route 423 (Osaka - Senri - Kameoka, "New-Midōsuji")

Expressways 
 Hanshin Expressway
 Meishin Expressway (Asian Highway 1)
 Shin-Meishin Expressway
 Chūgoku Expressway (Asian Highway 1)
 Sanyō Expressway
 Kinki Expressway
 Maizuru-Wakasa Expressway (to Maizuru)
 Nishi-Meihan Expressway (to Nara Prefecture, Nagoya)
 Hanwa Expressway (to Wakayama Prefecture)
 Keinawa Expressway
 Kobe-Awaji-Naruto Expressway (to Tokushima Prefecture)
 Kyoto Jūkan Expressway (to Miyazu)

Maritime transport

Passenger ferries 
Osaka's international ferry connections are far greater than Tokyo's, mostly due to geography.  There are international ferries that leave Osaka for Shanghai, Korea, and until recently Taiwan.  Osaka's domestic ferry services include regular service to ports such as Shimonoseki, Kagoshima, and Okinawa.

Shipping 
Shipping plays a crucial role for moving freight in and out of the Keihanshin area. Although in the 1970s the port of Kobe was the busiest in the world by containers handled, it no longer ranks among the top twenty worldwide. Kansai area is home to 5 existing LNG terminals.
 Port of Kobe
 Port of Osaka
 Port of Sakai-Senboku (In Osaka Prefecture)
 Port of Himeji

Other modes

Greater Osaka is little different from the rest of Japan in the other modes of transport.

The first automated bicycle system in the region was installed at the North Exit of Nishinomiya Station (Hanshin) in 2010, capable of handling 414 bicycles.

See also
 Transport in Greater Tokyo
 Transport in Greater Nagoya
 Transport in Fukuoka-Kitakyūshū
 List of urban rail systems in Japan

References

External links
 Keihanshin Railway Network Map
 Kansai Railway Network Map - Kansai One Pass
 Expressway Numbering Route Map - Ministry of Land, Infrastructure, Transport and Tourism (MLIT)
 Port and Airport Department - Kinki Regional Development Bureau, MLIT

Transport in Japan
Transport in Osaka Prefecture
Transport in Hyōgo Prefecture
Transport in Kyoto Prefecture
Keihanshin